Kakabadze or Kakabadse is a Georgian surname that may refer to:
 David Kakabadze, Georgian painter
 Irakli Kakabadze, Georgian writer
 Sargis Kakabadze, Georgian historian and philologist
 Silovan Kakabadze, Georgian sculptor and teacher
 Mikheil Kakabadze, Georgian geologist

 Andrew Kakabadse, British professor of Georgian origin
 Yolanda Kakabadse, Ecuadorian conservationist of Georgian origin

See also 
 5270 Kakabadze (1979 KR), a main-belt asteroid discovered on 1979

Georgian-language surnames
Surnames of Georgian origin